Goldfly is the second studio album by the rock band Guster, released in 1997. The album was recorded in December 1996 at the House of Blues Studios in Encino, California. It sold around 20,000 copies as an independent release, before being picked up by Sire Records. The Sire version was remixed by Mike Shipley.

There are three versions of the album. The original, rare, independently released version has the hidden song "Melanie" before the first song. The version released on Hybrid/Sire Records has the hidden song as the eleventh track. The third version, distributed to members of Guster's rep program, is a bad CD pressing of the album which contains "Melanie" as the first track, while "Getting Even" and "Bury Me" are combined as a single track.

Track listing
"Great Escape"
"Demons"
"Perfect"
"Airport Song"
"Medicine"
"X-Ray Eyes"
"Grin"
"Getting Even"
"Bury Me"
"Rocketship"
"Melanie" (unlisted bonus track)

Personnel

Guster
 Ryan Miller - guitar, lead vocals
 Adam Gardner - guitar, lead vocals
 Brian Rosenworcel - percussion, background vocals

Additional musicians
 Davey Faragher - bass
 John Ferraro - drums
 Steve Lindsey - Hammond organ and Nord synthesizers
 Andy Happel - violin
 Rudy DiCello - cello

References

External links 
Goldfly at Discogs

Guster albums
1997 albums